List of busiest airports may refer to:
 Busiest airports by continent
 List of busiest airports by aircraft movements
 List of busiest airports by cargo traffic
 List of busiest airports by international passenger traffic
 List of busiest airports by passenger traffic
 List of the busiest airports

See also 
 :Category:Lists of busiest airports